Jaden is an English unisex given name with roots in Hebrew, meaning "God has heard." It is also found as a surname.

Notable people with the name "Jaden" include
Jaden Brown (born 1999), English footballer
Jaden Casella (born 2000), Australian footballer
Jaden Charles (born 2002), English footballer
Jaden Eikermann (born 2005), German diver
Jaden Hair, American food blogger
Jaden Hardy (born 2002), American basketball player
Jaden Hatwell (born 1977), New Zealand cricketer
Jaden Hendrikse (born 2000), South African rugby union footballer
Jaden Hill (born 1999), American baseball player
Jaden Ivey (born 2002), American basketball player
Jaden Leach (born 1992), American beauty pageant titleholder
Jaden McDaniels (born 2000), American basketball player
Jaden McGrath (born 1996), Australian rules footballer
Jaden McNeil (born 1999), American activist
Jaden Michael (born 2003), American actor
Jaden Montnor (born 2002), Dutch footballer
Jaden Philogene-Bidace (born 2002), English footballer
Jaden Schwartz (born 1992), Canadian ice hockey player
Jaden Servania (born 2001), Puerto Rican footballer
Jaden Shackelford (born 2001), American basketball player
Jaden Springer (born 2002), American basketball player
Jaden Smith (born 1998), American rapper

Fictional characters 
Jaden Korr, main character in the video game Star Wars Jedi Knight: Jedi Academy
Jaden Yuki, main character in the anime series Yu-Gi-Oh! GX

Surname
Aggrey Jaden (1928–1987), South Sudanese politician

See also
Jade (given name), a page for people with the given name "Jade"
Jadon, a page for the Hebrew name "Jadon"
Jayden, a page for people with the given name "Jayden"

References

English masculine given names